Phyllodactylus ventralis, the Margarita leaf-toed gecko, is a species of lizard found in northern Colombia, Venezuela (including Margarita Island), and according to some sources, also Grenada and other Windward Islands.

References

ventralis
Reptiles of Colombia
Reptiles of Venezuela
Reptiles described in 1875
Taxa named by Arthur William Edgar O'Shaughnessy